The Paralympic symbols are the icons, flags, and symbols used by the International Paralympic Committee to promote the Paralympic Games.

Motto
The Paralympic motto is "Spirit in Motion".
The motto was introduced in 2004 at the Paralympic Games in Athens.  The previous motto was "Mind, Body, Spirit", introduced in 1994.

Paralympic symbol

Current

The symbol of the Paralympic Games is composed of three "agitos", coloured red, blue, and green, encircling a single point, on a white field.  The agito ("I move" in Latin) is a symbol of movement in the shape of an asymmetrical crescent. The colours of the agitos with the white background stand for the three colours that are most widely represented in national flags around the world.  The three agitos encircle a centre point, to emphasize "the role that the International Paralympic Committee (IPC) has of bringing athletes from all corners of the world together and enabling them to compete". The shape also symbolises the Paralympic vision "To enable Paralympic athletes to achieve sporting excellence and inspire and excite the world".

The emblem was designed by the agency Scholz & Friends as a modernization of a tri-coloured emblem first adopted in 1992. It was used in a formal capacity for the first time during the closing ceremony of the 2004 Summer Paralympics in Athens, where a new Paralympic flag with the emblem was handed over to Beijing—host of the 2008 Summer Paralympics. The agitos were used as part of the branding for a Paralympics for the first time at the 2006 Winter Paralympics.

In October 2019, the IPC unveiled a new corporate identity and a refreshed version of the Agitos emblem; the three crescents were changed to have a more "strict" geometry with consistent shapes and alignment, and the colours were brightened to match those used in the Olympic rings. The IPC also announced a new "brand narrative" of "Change Starts with Sport", to "better communicate the transformational impact the Paralympic Movement has on society and drive the human rights agenda."

Previous

The first designated Paralympic logo was created for the 1988 Summer Paralympics in Seoul and based on a traditional Korean decorative component called a pa {Hangul: 파; Hanja: 巴}, two of which make up the taegeuk symbol at the center of the flag of South Korea.  The first Paralympic flag used five pa arranged similarly to the Olympic rings and coloured identically.

Nearby, two years after adopted in 6 October 1990, the International Coordinating Committee of World Sports Organizations for the Disabled (ICC) was informed in a telegram, that the International Olympic Committee (IOC) requested that five-pa symbol had to be altered, as the IOC's marketing department considered it too similar to the Olympic rings and this could lead a confusion about the similarity of the logos.  A new symbol was created and was planned to be used starting in 1991 included six overlapping pa in a circle, representing the then 6 IPC regions (Africa, Americas, Asia, Europe, Middle East and Oceania). In November 1991, the IPC members voted against the new symbol, retaining the five-pa symbol. However, the IOC made clear that it would refuse future collaborations with the IPC if the five-pa symbol remained in place.

In March 1992, the Paralympic symbol was simplified to a new version utilizing only three pa, representing the new motto of the institution - Body, Soul and Spirit.

Following a new agreement between the IOC and the IPC, the symbol would have to be immediately discontinued after the 1994 Winter Paralympics in Lillehammer, Norway, since the Lillehammer Paralympic Organizing Committee (LPOC) had by then already started a marketing program based on the five-pa version. The three-pa version remained in place from the closing of the Lillehammer Games through the  2004 Summer Paralympics closing ceremonies held in Athens, Greece.

Paralympic emblems
As the Olympic Games,each Paralympic Games edition has its own Paralympic emblem that embodies their vision and ideals for that edition.Every emblem is individual and respects the local design and own personality.

See also::Category:Summer Paralympic Games and :Category:Winter Paralympic Games for various Paralympic emblems. Those designs incorporates their version of the Paralympic symbol,used at the time,the name and year of the event, and one or more distinctive and cultural elements of the host country or city to identify the event.

It is the responsibility of the International Paralympic Committee (IPC) to approve Paralympic emblems for the Paralympic Games. The Paralympic emblems are used in promotional materials, by sponsors, and on the uniforms of every Paralympic competitor. All emblems are the property of the IPC.

Rome 1960 –
Tokyo 1964 –
Tel Aviv 1968 –
Heidelberg 1972 –
Toronto 1976 –
Örnsköldsvik 1976 –
Arnhem 1980 –
Geilo 1980 –
Stoke Mandeville & New York 1984 –
Innsbruck 1984 –
Seoul 1988 –
Innsbruck 1988 –
Tignes-Albertville 1992 – designed by Jean-Michel Folon
Barcelona 1992 – Originally, the Organizing Committee of the XXV Summer Olympic Games (COOB'92) as the first unifield Organizing Committee, proposed to the ICC and the IOC the use of the same logo as the Olympic Games, but with the removal of the Olympic rings and in their place the word "Paralympics".Both IOC and ICC rejected the proposal and in the second version the 5 pa used in Seoul were added. However, the proposal was again rejected.A third proposal was created and was acepted by the two parts.The new logo symbolized an individual (man or woman) in a dynamic attitude in a wheelchair, "a human figure in a sports attitude". It was based upon a symbolic depiction of a human figure using a wheelchair. This design is an adapted version of the Olympic logo, with a simple modification: the athlete's legs are replaced by a circle symbolizing,the spinning world,a wheelchair and the adapted sport.As the Olympic logo red and yellow are the colors of Spain and meaning the sun and the life and blue is used to reference to the Mediterranean Sea and the "Mediterranean-ness" of Barcelona. The use of Times Demi Bold (New Roman) typography references antiquity and Romanness, Latin-ness and seriousness.
Lillehammer 1994 – Depicting the sun people. This image portrayed the ideas of power, vitality, strength and energy, all of which are characteristics of the athletes who took part.
Atlanta 1996 – Entitled ‘Starfire’ the logo for the Atlanta Paralympics was meant to represent the fulfilment of an athlete's dream and the phoenix myth. It may be interpreted as the star being the athlete and the fire being the passion that burns in the heart to fulfil their dreams. The fifth point of the star, revealed by the ‘dynamic flow of the rings’ represents the fulfilment of the athletes’ quest.
Nagano 1998 – The logo design selected for the Nagano 1998 Winter Paralympics was designed by Sadahiko Kojima following the announcement of a national competition. It represents a simplified form of the Chinese character ‘naga’ for Nagano. It also symbolises a rabbit jumping and playing in snow or on ice with the swift movements that are characteristic of rabbits. This figure was combined with the Games details and the former IPC logo of three tae-gu
Sydney 2000 – The Sydney 2000 Paralympic Games logo embodies the vitality of Sydney, the spirit of Australia and the ability and achievement of the Paralympic athlete. The logo depicts a dynamic human form — represented by three graphic shapes — leaping triumphantly forward and “breaking through” towards the Paralympic Games in 2000. It also portrays the Paralympic torch and echoes the sails of Sydney's greatest landmark, the Sydney Opera House. The logo cast by the three Paralympic colors represented by Australia's unique shades of these colors: the rich blue of Sydney Harbour, the warm red of the Outback, and the lush green of the forest .
Salt Lake 2002 – The logo for the Salt Lake Paralympics can be split into three distinct parts making up the whole. The sphere at the top represents both the global unity and the new moment of the Paralympic Movement and also the head of the Paralympic athlete, which the overall logo appears to depict. The two broad fluid lines represent the athlete in motion with the three tae-guks, the then IPC logo, beneath the athlete.
Athens 2004 – Called as "Son of Sun" was a designed logo inspired by Disk of Hephaestus and the Sun. This design   aimed to embody the strength and determination of the Paralympic athlete. It features the profile of an athlete – male or female – looking forward, symbolising optimism for the future. At the same time, this human face attempts to reflect the individual's willpower and determination to succeed in all pursuits. The face's lines are smooth, and the chosen colors is warm and bright shades of orange Hephaestus and Sun colors)– harbinger of the great celebration to come.
Torino 2006 – Three graphic elements,used as part of the Olympic Games logo design,with a different position.The figure represent human figures creating an upward soaring movement. Designed by the Benincasa-Husmann Studio
Beijing 2008 – Dubbed ‘Sky, Earth and Human Beings’ and unveiled during a grand ceremony at the China Millennium Monument on July 13, 2004 in Beijing, the logo for the Beijing 2008 Paralympic Games is in the form of an athlete in motion. It is intended to embody the tremendous efforts that persons with a disability have to make in sport as well as in everyday life. It is typically chinese in its form and style and the three agitos colours used in a different way,as they represent the sun (red), the sky (blue) and the earth (green). They are also intended to reflect the integration of heart, body and spirit, which are at the core values of chinese culture as well as the Paralympic Games.
Vancouver 2010 – "Man becomes Mountain": Captures a recort of Vancouver coast and Whistler's forests,as the common things in the two city as the mountains, and the sky.
London 2012 – This logo was  designed by Wolff Olins, was published on 4 June 2007.Has the same design as the Olympic logo. However, with minor changes such as the colored lines and small parts and the addition of the words "Paralympic Games" and the Agitos in place at the Olympic Rings.Is a representation of the number 2012, with the Paralympic Agitos embedded within the zero. The standard colours are also green, magenta, orange and blue.In order to differentiate the two logos, tactile and colourful lines and areas marks were made within the number 2012. The emblem was released on the same day as the emblem for the Olympic Games.
Sochi 2014 – "sochi2014.ru" was the only Paralympic emblem to include a web address. The mirror of "Sochi" and "2014" 'reflects' that Sochi is a meeting point between sea and mountains. The same essential logo shape is to be used for both the Olympic and Paralympic Games,but with different colours and the agitos replacing the Olympic Rings. The emblem was released on December 12, 2009, ca 11 days after the emblem for the Olympic Games.
Rio 2016 – A stylized heart in 3D, symbolizing inclusion, passion, tolerance and  the warmth of brazilian people.
PyeongChang 2018 - The same Korean letter that symbolises snow, ice and the Paralympic athletes.The two letters together are said to portray a grand festival for the athletes, the audience and everyone around the globe. The letters sitting side-by-side also signify equality, with South Korea's five cardinal colours being used to represent the uniqueness of each individual.
Tokyo 2020 –  The Paralympic emblem features the same indigo-coloured checkerboard that was part of the Olympic logo, but positioned as hand fan in a circle form, filled with an indigo-colored checkerboard pattern. The design is meant to "express a refined elegance and sophistication that exemplifies the Japanese design". The design replaced the previous design which had been scrapped due to allegations that it plagiarized the logo of the Théâtre de Liège in Belgium.
Beijing 2022 -  Had the inspiration of a paralympic seated skier with a chinese ribbon motif and the Chinese character "飞" (fēi, means fly), with the rainbow colors.
Paris 2024 - The emblem for the 2024 Summer Olympics and Paralympics was unveiled on 21 October 2019 at the Grand Rex. For the first time, a Paralympic Games will share the exact same emblem as their corresponding Olympics, with no difference or variation to reflect the two events sharing a single "ambitions". When showed to the public it was explained that "In terms of legacy, Paris City believes, that around the world, the people have needs to strengthen the place of sport in their daily life and whatever the age, whatever the disability or ability, all the persons have a place and a role to play in the success of Paris 2024.
Milan & Cortina 2026 -
Los Angeles 2028 -
Brisbane 2032 -

Flag

The Paralympic flag has a white background, with the Paralympic symbol in the centre.

The current version of the Paralympic flag was first flown in 2019.

Flame and torch relay
Until the 2010 Winter Paralympics, the host country chose the site and the method through which the Paralympic Torch was lit. Since the 2012 Summer Paralympics, the concept of the Paralympic Torch Relay has changed and the Official Paralympic Flame is always created in the Games host city by uniting different regional flames. For London 2012 four regional flames from the national capitals of London, Belfast, Edinburgh and Cardiff were brought together in Stoke Mandeville, the birthplace of the Paralympic movement, on 29 August 2012 to create the London 2012 Paralympic Flame. In the future not only flames from regions of the host country will be united, but also other international flames. As such Stoke Mandeville will feature in all future Paralympic Torch Relays with the lighting of the Heritage Flame which will then travel to the host city to join all other flames. During the final 1–2 days the torch follows a linear relay route and, on the day of the Opening Ceremony, the flame reaches the main stadium and is used to light a cauldron situated in a prominent part of the venue to signify the beginning of the Games. Then it is left to burn throughout the Games till the Closing Ceremony, when it is extinguished to signify the end of the Games.

For the first time, on 1 March 2014, Stoke Mandeville ran the first ever Heritage Flame lighting ceremony in advance of the Sochi 2014 Winter Paralympics.  An Armillary Sphere has been created which will be used at all future Heritage Flame events to create the spark by human endeavor of a wheelchair user. London 2012 paralympian Hannah Cockroft was the first person to create the spark where Caz Walton lit the Sochi Torch and Cauldron, Andy Barlow transferred the flame to Sochi and finally Denise Knibbs lit the Paralympic lantern.

Medals
The Paralympic medals awarded to winners are another symbol associated with the Paralympic Games. The medals are made of gold-plated silver (commonly described as gold medals), silver, or bronze, and awarded to the top 3 finishers in a particular event.

For each Paralympic Games, the medals are designed differently, reflecting the host of the games.

Anthem

The Paralympic Anthem, also known as the Paralympic Hymn, is played when the Paralympic Flag is raised. It is a musical piece, "Hymne de l’Avenir" (en. "Anthem of the Future") composed by Thierry Darnis. The anthem was approved by the IPC in March 1996.

Australian country singer Graeme Connors wrote the lyrics for the anthem in 2001. As of 2023, the lyrics are implemented yet.

Paralympic Oath
The Paralympic Oath is a solemn promise made by one athlete—as a representative of each of the participating Paralympic competitors; and by one judge—as a representative of each officiating Paralympic referee or other official, at the opening ceremonies of each Paralympic Games.

The athlete, from the team of the organizing country, holds a corner of the Paralympic Flag while reciting the oath:

Athletes' Oath
In the name of all the competitors I promise that we shall take part in these Paralympic Games, respecting and abiding by the rules which govern them, committing ourselves to a sport without doping and without drugs, in the true spirit of sportsmanship, for the glory of sport and the honour of our teams.

The judge, also from the host nation, holds a corner of the flag but takes a slightly different oath:

Judges' Oath (Officials' Oath)
In the name of all the judges and officials, I promise that we shall officiate in these Paralympic Games with complete impartiality, respecting and abiding by the rules which govern them in the true spirit of sportsmanship.

The coach, from the host nation, holds a corner of the flag but takes a slightly different oath:

Coaches' Oath
In the name of all coaches and other members of the athletes entourage, I promise that we shall commit ourselves to ensuring that the spirit of sportsmanship and fair play is fully adhered to and upheld in accordance with the fundamental principles of the Paralympic movement.

History
The first Paralympic Oath was taken at the first Paralympic Games, in Rome in 1960. The Paralympic Oath is identical to the Olympic Oath, with the exception of the word 'Olympic' being substituted by 'Paralympic'. The Oath was originally written by Pierre de Coubertin. The first oath (an Athlete's Oath) was taken at the Olympic Games in Antwerp in 1920. The original text by Coubertin, has since been modified several times. The first Judge's/Official's Oath was taken at the Olympic Games in Sapporo in 1972. The first Coach's Oath was taken at the Paralympic Games in London in 2012.

Speakers

Athletes and judges that have taken the Paralympic Oath are listed below.

Paralympic Order

The Paralympic Order is the highest award of the Paralympic Movement. The recipients get a medal with the IPC logo on it. The Paralympic Order is awarded to individuals for particularly distinguished contribution to the Paralympic Movement.

Post-nominal
Starting in 2022, the International Paralympic Committee introduced post nominals, PLY, to recognize their contribution to the Paralympic movement, similar to the International Olympic Committee's OLY. It was first awarded to Ragnhild Myklebust and Kevin Coombs.

Mascots

Each Paralympic Games have a mascot, usually an animal native to the area or occasionally human figures representing the cultural heritage. Nowadays, most of the merchandise aimed at young people focuses on the mascots, rather than the Paralympic flag or organization logos.

See also
 List of Paralympic mascots
 Olympic symbols

References

External links
 Official site of the Paralympic Movement – Images and information on every game since 1960.
 The Paralympic Flag

 
Anthems of organizations